Sabados is a surname. Notable people with the surname include:

Andy Sabados (1916–2004), American football player
Steven Sabados, Canadian television show host